Blue Mood: The Songs of T-Bone Walker is a tribute album by Duke Robillard, dedicated to the songs of T-Bone Walker.

Critical reception
JazzTimes thought that Robillard "has the appropriately funky, slicing tone on 'T-Bone Shuffle', and 'T-Bone Boogie'."

AllMusic wrote that "the barroom blues and drum brushes on 'Love Is a Gamble' takes things down to a creepy crawl, bringing to mind Dr. John or Delbert McClinton."

Track listing 
All tracks composed by T-Bone Walker; except where noted.
 "Lonesome Woman Blues" (John Henry) – 4:08
 "T-Bone Shuffle" – 5:07
 "Love Is a Gamble" (Edward Hale) – 4:37
 "Alimony Blues" (Freddie Simon) – 3:28
 "You Don't Love Me" – 4:13
 "T-Bone Boogie" (T-Bone Walker, Marl Young) – 5:24
 "Blue Mood" (Jessie Mae Robinson) – 3:10
 "Pony Tail" (Dave Bartholomew, David J. O'Brian) – 3:07
 "I'm Still in Love with You" (T-Bone Walker, Marl Young) – 8:58
 "Hard Way" – 2:46
 "Born to Be No Good" – 5:34
 "Tell Me What's the Reason" (Florence Cadrez) – 2:49

Personnel 
 Duke Robillard - electric and acoustic guitars, vocals
 Matt McCabe - piano
 Jesse Williams - double bass
 Mark Teixeira - drums
 Doug James - baritone and tenor saxophone
 "Sax" Gordon Beadle - tenor saxophone
 Billy Novick - alto saxophone, clarinet
 Al Basile - cornet
 John Abrahamsen - trumpet
 Carl Querfurth – trombone

Other credits 

 Holger Petersen - Executive Producer
 John Paul Gauthier - Engineer, Recording, Mixing

References

T-Bone Walker tribute albums
2004 albums
Duke Robillard albums
Stony Plain Records albums